Gabriele Marchegiani (born 3 June 1996) is an Italian professional footballer who plays as a goalkeeper for  club Trento.

Club career
Marchegiani made his professional debut in the Serie B for SPAL on 21 November 2016 in a game against Trapani.

On 13 August 2019, he signed a two-year contract with Novara. On 30 January 2020, he was loaned to Ascoli with an option to purchase.

On 8 April 2021, he announced that his contract with Potenza was terminated.

On 9 November 2021, he joined Trento.

Personal life
He is a son of former goalkeeper Luca Marchegiani.

References

External links
 

Living people
1996 births
Footballers from Rome
Italian footballers
Association football goalkeepers
Italy youth international footballers
U.S. Pistoiese 1921 players
S.P.A.L. players
A.S. Gubbio 1910 players
Novara F.C. players
Ascoli Calcio 1898 F.C. players
Potenza Calcio players
A.C. Trento 1921 players
Serie A players
Serie B players
Serie C players